The list below is the ranking of countries by growth rate.

In 2017 
Countries by real GDP per capita (PPP) growth according to The World Bank.

25 years change
GDP per capita, PPP (constant 2011 international $) by World Bank

1800–2015 (Estimated by gapminder)

215 year cycle
Annual growth rate by 215-year cycle by Gapminder Base on Maddison and World Blank data

by 25 years cycle 
Annual growth rate by 25 years cycle by Gapminder Base on Maddison and World Blank data

See also
List of countries by GDP (PPP) per capita
List of countries by past and projected GDP (PPP) per capita

References

Lists of countries by GDP per capita